Volodymyr Bidlovskyi (born 31 May 1988 in Ukrainian SSR) is a professional Ukrainian football midfielder who plays as a midfielder.

Career
After graduating from the Ternopil Youth School System he joined the professional ranks by signing with FC Karpaty Lviv in the Ukrainian First League. After Karpaty secured promotion in 2006 he played in several matches in the Ukrainian Premier League. Throughout his tenure with Lviv he featured in the Ukrainian Second League with FC Karpaty-2 Lviv, and was loaned to PFC Oleksandria, and FC Krymteplytsia Molodizhne. In 2014, he permanently signed with PFC Oleksandria, and secured promotion to the Ukrainian Premier League. The following season he returned to the Ukrainian First League to play with FC Obolon-Brovar Kyiv.

After a season in Kyiv he played in the Ukrainian Second League with FC Rukh Vynnyky, and assisted in securing promotion to the Ukrainian First League in 2016–2017. In 2018, he played abroad in the Canadian Soccer League with FC Vorkuta., where he assisted in securing the CSL Championship.

Honors 
FC Vorkuta

 CSL Championship: 2018
 Canadian Soccer League First Division: 2019

References 

1988 births
Living people
Sportspeople from Ternopil
Ukrainian footballers
FC Karpaty Lviv players
FC Karpaty-2 Lviv players
FC Oleksandriya players
FC Krymteplytsia Molodizhne players
FC Obolon-Brovar Kyiv players
FC Rukh Lviv players
Association football midfielders
FC Continentals players
Ukrainian Premier League players
Ukrainian First League players
Canadian Soccer League (1998–present) players
Ukrainian expatriate footballers
Ukrainian expatriate sportspeople in Canada
Expatriate soccer players in Canada
Ukrainian Second League players